The Energy Act 2008 (c 32) is an Act of the Parliament of the United Kingdom.

Section 110 - Commencement 
Orders made under section 110(2)
The Energy Act 2008 (Commencement No. 1 and Savings) Order 2009 (S.I. 2009/45 (C.4))
The Energy Act 2008 (Commencement No. 2) Order 2009 (S.I. 2009/559 (C.38))
The Energy Act 2008 (Commencement No. 3) Order 2009 (S.I. 2009/1270 (C.68))
The Energy Act 2008 (Commencement No. 4 and Transitional Provisions) Order 2009 (S.I. 2009/2809 (C.123))
The Energy Act 2008 (Commencement No. 5) Order 2010 (S.I. 2009/1888 (C.97))

References
Halsbury's Statutes,

External links
The Energy Act 2008, as amended, from the National Archives.
The Energy Act 2008, as originally enacted, from the National Archives.
Explanatory notes to the Energy Act 2008.

United Kingdom Acts of Parliament 2008